The following are notable organizations devoted to the advocacy, legal aid, financial aid, technical aid, governance, etc. of free and open-source software (FOSS) as a whole, or of one or more specific FOSS projects. For projects that have their own foundation or are part of an umbrella organization, the primary goal is often to provide a mechanism for funding development of the software.

For the most part, these organizations are structured as nonprofit/charity organizations.

This list does not include companies that aim to make money from free and open-source software.

Location-specific

Africa 

Ma3bar – a United Nations-affiliated organization that promotes open source software within the Arab world.

Asia 

 Free Software Movement of India – founded in 2010; a coalition of organizations that advocate the use of free software within India.
 Regional movements
 Democratic Alliance of Knowledge Front, Kerala (abbrv. DAKF)
 Free Software Movement of Delhi/NCR
 Free Software Movement of Karnataka (abbrv. FSMK)
 Free Software Movement of Maharashtra (abbrv. FSMM)
 Free Software Movement of Rajasthan
 Free Software Foundation Tamilnadu (abbrv. FSFTN)
 Free Software Movement of West Bengal
 Swadhin, Odisha
 Swecha, Telangana & Andhra Pradesh
 Sectoral movements
 Appropriate Technology Promotion Society
 Knowledge Commons
 National Consultative Committee of Computer Teachers Association(abbrv. NCCCTA)
 Open Source Geospatial Foundation India (abbrv. OSGEO India)
 Free Software Foundation of India (founded 2001)
 International Center for Free and Opensource Software – founded in 2011; ICFOSS is an autonomous organization set up by the Government of Kerala, India for Free and Open Source Software.
 International Open Source Network – promoted the use of open-source software in Asia.
 Open Source Alliance of Central Asia – founded in 2011; advocates for the use of open source software in Central Asia.
 Hamakor – founded in 2003; promotes the use of free and open-source software in Israel.

Australia 

 Open Source Industry Australia – founded in 2004; promotes open source in Australia, as well as the use of Australian open source software and services around the world.

Europe 

 Free Software Foundation Europe (founded 2001)
 Irish Free Software Organisation – promotes the use of free software in Ireland.
 OpenForum Europe – founded in 2002; advocates for the use of open source software in Europe.
 Open Technologies Alliance (GFOSS) – founded in 2008; promotes the use of open-source software, open hardware, open data and content in education, in government and the private sector, at all levels, in Greece and cooperates closely with similar organizations in Europe and worldwide.
 Open Source Observatory and Repository – a project launched by the European Commission, to support the distribution and re-use of software developed by or for public sector administrations across Europe
 April – founded in 1996; promotes free software in the French-speaking world.
 Associação Nacional para o Software Livre – founded in 2001; promotes the use of free software in Portugal.
 Digital Freedom Foundation (DFF) – founded in 2004; organizes Software and other Freedom Days
 "Ceata" Foundation, Romania - officially  founded in 2013, but active since 2008 as an informal group
 "ProLinux" Association, Romania - founded in 2009
 "ROSEdu" Association, Romania
 "Informatica la Castel" Free Software Summer School, Arad, Romania - founded in 2003
 Open Source Business Alliance, Germany.

North America 

 Free Software Foundation (FSF) – founded in 1985; began as a development center for the GNU Project. It currently advocates for free software and against proprietary software and formats; and maintains and legally enforces the GNU General Public License. It also created the Free Software Definition.
Open Source Initiative (OSI) – founded in 1998; promotes open source software from a pragmatic rather than moral perspective. Also created the Open Source Definition.
Open Source for America (OSFA) – a consortium of organizations advocating for the use of FOSS in the United States.
 Mil-OSS – founded in 2009; promotes the use of open-source software in the United States Department of Defense.
 Open Source Software Institute (OSSI) – founded in 2000; promotes the use of open-source software in the United States within government, at all levels.
 Fairfield Programming Association (FPA) – founded in 2020; focused on education and creating open-source software as learning resources.

South America 

 Free Software Foundation Latin America (founded 2005)
 Fundación Vía Libre – founded in 2000; advocates digital rights and the use of free software in Latin America, especially within government.

Oceania 

 New Zealand Open Source Society – founded in 2003; promotes the use of open-source software in New Zealand.
 Free Software Initiative of Japan – founded in 2002; supports free software within Japan

Umbrella organizations
The following organizations host, and provide other services, for a variety of different open-source projects:
Apache Software Foundation (ASF) – founded in 1999 with headquarters in Wakefield, MA, USA; manages the development of over 350 Apache software projects, including the Apache HTTP Server.
Eclipse Foundation – founded in 2004 with headquarters in Ottawa, ON, Canada; supports the development of over 350 Eclipse projects, including the Eclipse IDE.
Free Software Foundation (FSF) – founded in 1985 with headquarters in Boston, MA, USA; supports the free software movement, which promotes the universal freedom to study, distribute, create, and modify computer software
GNOME Foundation – founded in 2000 with headquarters in Orinda, CA, USA; coordinates the efforts of the GNOME Project, including GNOME
KDE e.V. – founded in 1997 with headquarters in Berlin, Germany; coordinates the efforts of KDE Projects including KDE
Linux Foundation (LF) – founded in 2000 with headquarters in San Francisco, CA, USA; supports the development of the Linux kernel, as well as over 60 other projects, only some of which are connected to Linux. Also does advocacy, training and standards.
Cloud Native Computing Foundation (CNCF) – founded in 2015, to promote containers. It was announced with Kubernetes 1.0,  an open source container cluster manager, which was contributed to the foundation by Google as a seed technology.
OASIS Open - founded in 1993; provides communities with foundation-level support, IP and license management, governance, and outreach with an optional path for work to be recognized by de jure standards organizations and referenced in public procurement.
OpenInfra Foundation – founded in 2012 with headquarters in Austin, TX; focused on the development and support of open source infrastructure projects, including OpenStack. Previously known as the OpenStack Foundation. 
OW2 – founded in 2007 with headquarters in Paris, France; focused on infrastructure for enterprise middleware
Open Source Initiative (OSI) – founded in 1998 with headquarters in Palo Alto, CA, USA; steward of the Open Source Definition, the set of rules that define open source software
Sahana Software Foundation – founded in 2009 with headquarters in Los Angeles, CA, USA; for humanitarian-related software
Software Freedom Conservancy – founded in 2006 with headquarters in New York, NY, USA; hosts around 40 projects.
Software in the Public Interest (SPI) – founded in 1997 with headquarters in New York, NY, USA; originally only for the Debian project, it now hosts around 35 projects, some of which are umbrella projects themselves.
VideoLAN – founded in 2009 with headquarters in Paris, France; multimedia-related projects

Domain-specific organizations
The following organizations host open-source projects that relate to a specific technical area.

freedesktop.org – founded in 2000; hosted by SPI since 2015. Hosts around 25 projects, mostly related to the X Window System.
Open Bioinformatics Foundation – founded in 2001; hosted by SPI since 2012. Hosts around 10 bioinformatics projects.
Open Source Geospatial Foundation – founded in 2006; hosts roughly 25 projects related to geospatial technology.
Open Source Security Foundation – founded in 2020
OSADL – founded in 2005; supports the development of various projects, mostly Linux-based, for the machine tool and automation industries.
Xiph.Org Foundation – founded in 1994 as the "Xiphophorus Company"; became a non-profit under its current name in 2003. Directly develops, and supports outside development of, multimedia-related software and formats.

Project-specific organizations
A large number of single-project organizations (often called "foundations") exist; in most cases, their primary purpose is to provide a mechanism to bring funds from the software's users, including both individuals and companies, to its developers.
.NET Foundation – founded in 2014; supports the development of open-source projects around the .NET Framework.
Alliance for Open Media – founded in 2015; attempting to develop a royalty-free video format.
Blender Foundation – founded in 2002; supports the development of the computer graphics software Blender.
CE Linux Forum – founded in 2003; supports the development of Linux for consumer electronics devices.
Django Software Foundation – founded in 2008; supports the development of the web framework Django.
The Document Foundation – founded in 2012; supports the development of the office suite LibreOffice.
Drupal Association – founded in 2009; does advocacy of the Drupal content management system, including running the DrupalCon conference.
F# Software Foundation – founded in 2013; supports the development of the F# programming language.
Firebird Foundation – founded in 2002; supports the development of the relational database Firebird.
FreeBSD Foundation – founded in 2001; supports the development of the operating system FreeBSD.
GNOME Foundation – founded in 2000; coordinates the development of the GNOME desktop environment.
KDE e.V. – founded in 1997; supports the development of desktop applications by the KDE community.
 Krita Foundation – founded in 2013; supports the development of the Krita digital painting application.
Kuali Foundation – founded in 2005; develops the Kuali family of enterprise resource planning software for higher education institutions.
Mozilla Foundation – founded in 2003; supports and manages development of the Mozilla project, in conjunction with the Mozilla Corporation, a for-profit company it owns.
NetBSD Foundation – founded in 1995; supports the development of the operating system NetBSD.
Open Invention Network – founded in 2005; acquires patent non-assertion promises from its members towards other organization members, focused on Linux
OpenBSD Foundation – founded in 2007; supports the development of the operating system OpenBSD and its utilities.
OpenStreetMap Foundation – founded in 2006; supports the development of the OpenStreetMap mapping software.
Perl Foundation – founded in 2000; supports the development of the Perl programming language, including running Yet Another Perl Conference.
Plone Foundation – founded in 2004; supports the development of the Plone web content management system.
Python Software Foundation – founded in 2001; supports the development of the Python programming language.
The Rosetta Foundation – founded in 2009; develops the Service-Oriented Localisation Architecture Solution.
Rails Foundation – founded in 2022; supports and advocates for the community who uses the web framework Ruby on Rails.
Ruby Central – founded in 2002; supports and advocates for the use of the Ruby programming language.
Rust Foundation - founded in 2021; supports the Rust programming language and ecosystem, with a unique focus on supporting the set of maintainers that govern and develop the project.
Sahana Software Foundation – founded in 2009; develops the Sahana suite of disaster and emergency management software.
Signal Foundation – founded in 2018; supports the development of the encrypted communications application Signal.
SIPfoundry – founded in 2004; develops the sipXecs communications system, and does related advocacy.
Sourcefabric – founded in 2010 as a spinoff from the Media Development Investment Fund; develops software for independent news media organizations.
Symbian Foundation – existed from 2008 to 2011; supported the development of the now-defunct Symbian operating system.
VideoLAN – founded in 2009; supports the development of the VLC media player and related software.
Wikimedia Foundation - founded in 2003; develops MediaWiki and hosts related websites, such as the English Wikipedia
X.Org Foundation – founded in 2004; hosted by SPI since 2014. Does funding and advocacy related to the X Window System.
XMPP Standards Foundation – founded in 2001 as the Jabber Software Foundation; renamed in 2007. Supports development around the XMPP communications protocol.
Zope Foundation – founded in 2006; it promotes the development of the Zope platform by supporting the community that develops and maintains the relevant software components.

Cause-specific 
 Ada Initiative – existed from 2011 to 2015; advocated the participation of women in FOSS development.
 PyLadies – founded in 2011; advocates for female participation in the Python community.

Legal aid 
IfrOSS – provides legal services for free software in Germany.
Software Freedom Law Center – founded in 2005; provides free legal representation and other legal services to not-for-profit FOSS projects.

User groups
GNU/Linux Users Groups
Linux user group – the general term for organizations of Linux users; see :Category:Linux user groups.

References

 
Software